Livai Ikanikoda (born 30 October 1989) is a Fijian rugby sevens player who plays in the  Fiji national rugby sevens team. He plays in the playmaker position. Ikanikoda made his debut for Fiji in the 2011-2012 HSBC 7s series. After an absence of eight years from the Fiji national rugby sevens team due to a major leg injury, he played a critical role in the playmakers position that resulted in Fiji winning the 2019 Hong Kong Sevens, its fifth consecutive Hong Kong 7s title.

References 

1989 births
Living people
Fijian rugby sevens players